The panther danio (Danio aesculapii) is a species of danio endemic to Myanmar.  Before its description it was referred to as Danio species TW03. The panther is a smallish danio which on first glance looks a little dull, but displays a variety of colours when sunlight illuminates the fish on its side.

References

http://www.seriouslyfish.com

Danio
Endemic fauna of Myanmar
Taxa named by Sven O. Kullander
Taxa named by Fang Fang Kullander
Fish described in 2009